The threepence or 3d coin was a subdivision of the pre-decimal Irish pound, worth  of a pound or  of a shilling.  literally means "half ", the  being a sixpence coin worth about the same as the Spanish  (a quarter of a peseta). As with all other Irish coins, it resembled its British counterpart, as the Irish pound was pegged to the British pound until 1979.

Originally it was struck in nickel and was very hard-wearing. In 1942, as nickel became more costly, the metal was changed to cupronickel of 75% copper and 25% nickel. The coin was minted at the Royal Mint starting from 1928, and ceased to be legal tender after decimalisation on 31 December 1971. Ireland did not adopt the brass dodecagonal threepenny coin that the United Kingdom used between 1937 and 1971.

The reverse design featuring an Irish hare was by English artist Percy Metcalfe. The obverse featured the Irish harp. From 1928 to 1937 the date was split either side of the harp with the name  circling around. In 1990 it was announced that the decimal two-pence coin would be redesigned to incorporate the hare from the threepence, but this plan was abandoned in the face of the imminent adoption of the euro.

See also

£sd

References

External links
Coinage Act, 1926
Coinage (Dimensions and Designs) Order, 1928
Coinage (Calling In) Order, 1971
Irish Coinage website - catalogue - threepence

three-pence coin